The Pre-Anuradhapura period of Sri Lankan history begins with the gradual onset of historical records in the final centuries of the prehistoric period and ending in 437 BC. According to the Mahavamsa, the original inhabitants of Sri Lanka are the Yakshas and northern Naga tribes. Sinhalese history traditionally starts in 543 BC at the arrival of Prince Vijaya, a semi-legendary king who was banished from the Indian subcontinent with his 700 followers, and is recorded in the Mahavamsa chronicle. This period was succeeded by the Anuradhapura period.

Overview
Periodization of Sri Lanka history:

Background

According to folklore, the Naga people were one of the groups of original inhabitants of Lanka. They were said to have ruled Nagadeepa, or Jaffna Peninsula and Kelaniya. Naga people were snake-worshipers. The word Naga was sometimes written in early inscriptions as Nāya, as in Nāganika – this occurs in the Nanaghat inscription of 150 BC. Until the third century BC they appear as a distinct group in the early Sri Lankan chronicles as well as the early Tamil literary works. In the third century BC they started to assimilate to Tamil language and culture, and lost their separate identity.

Political History

The Kingdom of Tambapanni existed from 543 BC to 505 BC. According to Mahavamsa, the legendary Prince Vijaya and seven hundreds of his followers came to Sri Lanka after being expelled from Sinhapura in India. Vijaya is said to have landed on the island on the day of Gautama Buddha's death, and after reaching the heaven, the Buddha asked the deities to protect him so that he could spread Buddhism in Sri Lanka. Prince Vijaya established the Kingdom of Tambapanni. He married a local Yakkhini named Kuveni, and their children gave rise to the Pulinda race (identified with the Vedda people). Vijaya also married a princess of the Pandu kingdom (identified with Pandyan kingdom), but did not have any children with her. His followers also married maidens sent by the Pandu king, and their descendants gave rise to the Sinhalese race.

Historiography

The Pali chronicles, the Dipavamsa, Mahavamsa, Thupavamsa and the Culavamsa as well as a large collection of stone inscriptions, the Indian Epigraphical records, the Burmese versions of the chronicles etc., provide an exceptional record for the history of Sri Lanka from about the sixth century BC.

The Mahavamsa, written around 400 AD, using the Dipavamsa, the Attakatha and other written sources available, it correlates well with Indian histories of the period. Emperor Asoka's reign is recorded in the Mahavamsa. The Mahavamsa account of the period prior to Asoka's coronation, (218 years after the Buddha's death) seems to be part legend. The account of the Mahavamsa, a Pali text written largely from the Sinhalese perspective, has mythological beginnings but becomes historical from the third century BC, with the arrival of Buddhism under Devanampiya Tissa of Sri Lanka. Epigraphic sources also appear with the presence of Buddhism, from about the third century BC. The earliest historiographic literature, such as the Mahavamsa, dates to the sixth century AD. The entire ancient period of history written in the Mahavamsa, is dominated by the Anuradhapura Kingdom.  The medieval period in Sri Lanka is taken to begin with the fall of the Anuradhapura Kingdom in AD 1017.

Legacy
Within Sri Lanka, the legend of Vijaya is often treated as a factual account of a historical event. However, multiple scholars consider the legend of dubious historicity. Satchi Ponnambalam called it a "pure flight of fantasy". According to Gavin Thomas, the narration of historical events in Mahavamsa and its continuation Culavamsa is "at best questionably-biased, and at worst totally imaginary", aimed at establishing the royal lineage of the Sinhalese and the Buddhist credentials of the island. According to H.W. Codrington, Vijaya is probably a composite character, and the legend is aimed at connecting the early history of Sri Lanka with that of Buddha.

Monarchs

The House of Vijaya produced four monarchs and two regents who ruled during this period.

Timeline

Events
 543 BC: The Kingdom of Tambapanni is established by Prince Vijaya

In popular culture

 Vijaya Kuweni, 2012 Sinhala epic biographical history film.

See also
 Mahavamsa
 Sinhala Kingdom
 List of Sinhalese monarchs

References

Bibliography

Further reading

 

 
 

Pre Anuradhapura period
Sri Lanka